Lincolnton is a city in Lincoln County, North Carolina, United States, within the Charlotte metropolitan area. The population was 10,486 at the 2010 census. Lincolnton is northwest of Charlotte, on the South Fork of the Catawba River. The city is the county seat of Lincoln County, and is the only legally incorporated municipality wholly within the county.

History

This area was long occupied by varying cultures of indigenous peoples. It was not settled extensively by European Americans until after the American Revolution in the late 18th century.

In June 1780 during the American Revolutionary War, the future site of Lincolnton was the site of the Battle of Ramsour's Mill, a small engagement in which local Loyalists were defeated by pro-independence forces. Some historians consider the battle significant because it disrupted Loyalist organizing in the region at a crucial time.

After the Revolution, the legislature organized a new county by splitting this area from old Tryon County (named in the colonial era for a royally appointed governor). The 1780 battle site was chosen for the seat of Lincoln County. The new city and the county were named for Major General Benjamin Lincoln, who served in the Continental Army during the Revolutionary War.

The Piedmont area was developed for industry, based on using the water power from its streams and rivers. With the advantage of the South Fork of the Catawba, Lincolnton was the site of the first textile mill in North Carolina, constructed by Michael Schenck in 1813. It was the first cotton mill built south of the Potomac River. Cotton processing became a major industry in the area. St. Luke's Episcopal Church was founded in 1841.

During the American Civil War, Lincoln County had many residents who either joined or were conscripted to the Confederate Army. Among them was Major General Stephen Dodson Ramseur, who was mortally wounded at the Battle of Cedar Creek in Virginia in the final year of the war. His body was returned to Lincolnton for burial. Episcopal missionary bishop Henry C. Lay spent the final months of the Civil War in the town. Union forces occupied Lincoln County on Easter Monday, 1865, shortly before the close of the war.

As county seat and a center of the textile industry, city residents prospered on the returns from cotton cultivation. The city has numerous properties, including churches, which have been listed on the National Register of Historic Places since the late 20th century. It has three recognized historic districts: Lincolnton Commercial Historic District, South Aspen Street Historic District, and West Main Street Historic District. These were centers of the earliest businesses and retail activities. There was much activity around the Lincoln County Courthouse on court days, when farmers typically came to town to trade and sell their goods.

Residences, churches and other notable buildings marked the development of the city; they include the Caldwell-Cobb-Love House, Emanuel United Church of Christ, Emmanuel Lutheran Church, Eureka Manufacturing Company Cotton Mill, First Baptist Church, First Presbyterian Church, First United Methodist Church, Methodist Church Cemetery,  Lincolnton Recreation Department Youth Center, Loretz House, Old White Church Cemetery, Pleasant Retreat Academy, Shadow Lawn, St. Luke's Church and Cemetery, and Woodside.

In 1986, Lincolnton expanded by annexing the town of Boger City.

Geography
Lincolnton is in central Lincoln County in the Piedmont region of North Carolina. U.S. Route 321, a four-lane freeway, passes through the east side of the city, leading north  to Hickory and south  to Gastonia. North Carolina Highway 27 is Lincolnton's Main Street and leads southeast  to Mount Holly and west  to Toluca.

The city is sited on the northeastern side of the South Fork of the Catawba River, which flows southeast to join the Catawba River at the South Carolina border. Clark Creek joins the South Fork in the northwestern part of the city.

Government and politics

Lincolnton is governed by a mayor and four-member city council, who hire a city manager to oversee day-to-day governance. City council members serve four-year terms and the mayor serves for two years. They are elected in partisan elections in odd years. Council members represent city wards in which they must reside, but are elected at-large. The mayor conducts city meetings, normally the first Thursday of each month, and votes only in case of a tie.

Lincolnton government has traditionally been run solely by Democrats, but currently has a bipartisan government for the first time in its history. The city electorate narrowly backed Democrat Barack Obama in the 2008 presidential election. The rest of Lincoln County has generally leaned Republican, and heavily favored Republican John McCain in the 2008 election.

Edward L. Hatley (D) was elected as mayor in 2015. Hatley previously served as a member of the Lincoln County Board of Education. Lincolnton's City Council Members are Tim Smith(R) of Ward 1, David M. Black (D) of Ward 2, Dr. Martin A. Eaddy (D) of Ward 3, and Roby Jetton (R) of Ward 4. Council Members Smith, Black and Dr. Eaddy have their terms expire in 2017. The term of Council Member Jetton expires in 2019.

In 2018, Mary Frances White (D) became the first black elected official in Lincoln County's history.

Media

Lincolnton is home to one print newspaper and one radio station, plus a range of online news sites and blogs. The Lincoln Times-News was formed in the early 1960s by a merger between two much older publications. Based in historic downtown Lincolnton, the family-owned newspaper prints Monday, Wednesday and Friday afternoons and covers all of Lincoln County, for which it is the legal paper of record. WLON radio went on the air in the late 1950s or early 1960s and provides coverage of Lincolnton High School football every Friday night, as well as Atlanta Braves, NC State Wolfpack, and UNC Tar Heels sports events.  The online Lincoln Tribune was founded about six years ago with a print edition, but has since become an exclusively online publication. . Another news Web site, The Carolina Scoop, was founded in April 2008 and is no longer in existence.  Two free-distribution weekly papers—News@Norman and Denver Weekly—operate only in the eastern portion of Lincoln County. An on-line web paper, Lincoln Herald, began publishing in August 2012 (www.lincolnherald.com).

Demographics
The city has grown since 1980 as part of the Charlotte metropolitan area expansion.

2020 census

As of the 2020 United States census, there were 11,091 people, 4,668 households, and 2,652 families residing in the city.

2010 census
As of the census of 2010, there were 10,683 people, 3,878 households, and 2,943 families residing in the city. The population density was 1,219.4 people per square mile (470.9/km2). There were 4,146 housing units at an average density of 507.4 per square mile (195.9/km2). The racial makeup of the city was 65.98% White, 24.49% African American, 0.41% Asian, 0.33% Native American, 4.15% from other races, and 1.60% from two or more races. Hispanic or Latino of any race were 15.87% of the population.

There were 3,878 households, out of which 29.3% had children under the age of 18 living with them, 47.4% were married couples living together, 15.8% had a female householder with no husband present, and 32.6% were non-families. 28.4% of all households were made up of individuals, and 13.8% had someone living alone who was 65 years of age or older. The average household size was 2.46 and the average family size was 2.98.

In the city, the population was spread out, with 23.6% under the age of 18, 8.9% from 18 to 24, 27.1% from 25 to 44, 21.7% from 45 to 64, and 18.7% who were 65 years of age or older. The median age was 38 years. For every 100 females, there were 86.3 males. For every 100 females age 18 and over, there were 81.9 males.

The median income for a household in the city was $31,684, and the median income for a family was $39,949. Males had a median income of $29,615 versus $21,768 for females. The per capita income for the city was $16,667. About 14.4% of families and 17.3% of the population were below the poverty line, including 24.4% of those under age 18 and 15.9% of those age 65 or over.

Education
High schools

 East Lincoln High School 
 Lincoln Charter school 
 Lincolnton High School
 North Lincoln High School
 West Lincoln High School

Middle schools 

 East Lincoln Middle School  
 Lincoln Charter School 
 Lincolnton Middle School  
 North Lincoln Middle School 
 West Lincoln Middle School

Elementary schools: 
 Lincoln Charter School 
 Battleground Elementary School 
 GE Massey Elementary School 
 S Ray Lowder Elementary School
 Love Memorial Elementary School
 Norris S. Childers Elementary School
 Pumpkin Center Elementary School 
 Pumpkin Center Intermediate School

Charter schools:
 Lincoln Charter School

Colleges:
 Gaston College: Lincolnton Campus

Notable people
 Lester Andrews, chemist
 Paul Bost, racecar driver
 Dennis Byrd, member of College Football Hall of Fame
 Jim Cleamons, professional basketball player, assistant coach with nine NBA championships
 Charles L. Coon, teacher, school administrator, child labor reformer, and advocate for African American education
 Drew Droege, actor
 John Horace Forney,  major general in Confederate States Army during American Civil War
 Peter Forney, U.S. Representative from North Carolina and captain during Revolutionary War
 William H. Forney, U.S. Representative from Alabama; grandson of Peter Forney, nephew of Daniel Munroe Forney, and brother of John Horace Forney
 Charles A. Gabriel, 11th Chief of Staff of the United States Air Force
 William Alexander Graham, U.S. Secretary of the Navy, U.S. senator, member of Confederate Senate, governor of North Carolina and Whig candidate for vice president of the United States
 Connie Guion, pioneering female physician
 James Pinckney Henderson, first governor of Texas, U.S. senator, lawyer, politician and soldier
 Robert Hoke, Confederate major general who won Battle of Plymouth; businessman and railroad executive 
 William A. Hoke, associate justice and chief justice of North Carolina Supreme Court
 Rufus Zenas Johnston, recipient of Navy Cross and Congressional Medal of Honor
 Charles A. Jonas, politician and U.S. Representative from North Carolina
 Charles R. Jonas, U.S. Representative from North Carolina
 Devon Lowery, retired pitcher for Kansas City Royals
 Candace Newmaker, killed during therapy session; her death received international coverage
 Barclay Radebaugh, basketball coach at Charleston Southern University
 Stephen Dodson Ramseur, Confederate major general mortally wounded at the Battle of Cedar Creek, Virginia in 1864
 Hiram Rhodes Revels, first African-American U.S. senator
 Dick Smith, baseball player
 C. J. Wilson, professional football player
 Ken Wood, baseball player

Film
Parts of the erotic thriller film Careful What You Wish For were filmed in downtown Lincolnton in May 2013.

Lifetime movie My Stepson, My Lover (also known as Love, Murder and Deceit) was partly filmed in Lincolnton onsite at the Alda Crowe mansion.

References

External links
 
 Lincolnton–Lincoln County Chamber of Commerce

Cities in North Carolina
Cities in Lincoln County, North Carolina
County seats in North Carolina
Populated places established in 1813
1813 establishments in the United States